The Devil's Daffodil (also known as Daffodil Killer or / Secret of the Yellow Daffodils) is a 1961 British-West German black-and-white crime film directed by Ákos Ráthonyi. The film was produced in an English and a German version, starring different actors in the lead roles but otherwise featuring an almost identical cast and crew. It starred William Lucas in the English version and Joachim Fuchsberger in the German one.

Cast

Production
The film is based on the novel The Daffodil Mystery by Edgar Wallace. It was adapted for film by Egon Eis. The screenplay was written by Basil Dawson and Donald Taylor. Wendlandt was also co-producer along with Preben Philipsen (both of Rialto Film).

Cinematography took place in April and May 1961 in London and environments. The studio was Shepperton Studios/Middlesex.

Reception
In Germany, the FSK gave the film a rating of "16 and up" and found it not appropriate for screenings on public holidays. The German version premiered on 21 July 1961.

See also
 Christopher Lee filmography

References

External links

BFI.org

1961 films
1960s mystery films
1960s crime thriller films
1960s multilingual films
1960s English-language films
German mystery films
German crime thriller films
British mystery films
British crime thriller films
West German films
British black-and-white films
Films directed by Ákos Ráthonyi
Films based on British novels
Films based on works by Edgar Wallace
Films produced by Horst Wendlandt
Films set in London
British multilingual films
German multilingual films
UFA GmbH films
1960s German-language films
1960s British films
1960s German films